Baker and Lovering Store is a site on the National Register of Historic Places located in Joliet, Montana.  It was added to the Register on May 2, 1986. It was also known as Lovering and Smith.

It was the first brick building in Joliet and served as the only primary mercantile business in Joliet until 1929. The store was originally owned by G.A. Lovering and C.W. Baker. Baker sold his half of the business to T.W. Smith in 1907.

References

National Register of Historic Places in Carbon County, Montana
Commercial buildings completed in 1902
Commercial buildings on the National Register of Historic Places in Montana
1902 establishments in Montana